The Platz des Unsichtbaren Mahnmals – or in English, the Place of the Invisible Memorial – is a memorial to Jewish cemeteries. It is located in Saarbrücken, capital of the German state of the Saarland. To the visitor, the memorial is completely invisible – it only appears as a sign at the place, reading "Platz des Unsichtbaren Mahnmals".

In April 1990, art professor Jochen Gerz and several of his students began, in secrecy, to dig up cobblestones from the place in front of the Saarbrücken castle. The underside of the stones were then engraved with the names of German Jewish cemeteries, and afterwards they were returned to the place, with the inscription facing downwards. They chose the fore court of Saarbrücken Castle because a dependency of the Secret State Police, or Gestapo, was located in the castle during the time of national socialism.

In August 1991, the idea was taken up by the city council of Saarbrücken, and it decided to implement it legally. In the end, a total of 2146 location names of Jewish cemeteries, which had existed until their destruction by the Nazi regime in 1933, were engraved into the cobblestones, and again placed back into the fore court of the castle. The memorial intends to portray the neglect of the German past.

See also 
 Anti-monumentalism

External links 
 Page about the memorial at Gerz' website

Saarbrücken
Monuments and memorials in Germany
The Holocaust in Germany